Victor Emanuel van Vriesland (27 October 1892, Haarlem – 29 October 1974, Amsterdam) was a Dutch Jewish writer and critic.

Biography
He studied at the gymnasium in The Hague and then at the University of Dijon. He was literary and artistic journalist, editor of a weekly magazine. He received the Constantijn Huygens Prize in 1958 and the P. C. Hooft Award in 1960.  He was the president of the Dutch Pen Club. From 1962 to 1965 van Vriesland was President of PEN International, the worldwide association of writers. Van Vriesland writes as easily in French as in his native language and likes even the refinement of sintaxe and prosody:
Te souviendra
t-il de mon nom, de ma tendresse?
- Le vent qui bat ma fenetre sans cesse
L'effacera.

Bibliography 
 1915 - De cultureele noodtoestand van het Joodsche volk
 1920 - Herman Hana
 1925 - Der verlorene Sohn (in German)
 1926 - Het afscheid van de wereld in drie dagen (published in 1953)
 1929 - Voorwaardelijk uitzicht
 1933 - Havenstad
 1935 - Herhalingsoefeningen
 1939 - De ring met de aquamarijn
 1939-1954 - Spiegel der Nederlandse poëzie
 1946 - Vooronderzoek
 1946 - Grondslag van verstandhouding (published in 1947)
 1949 - Drievoudig verweer
 1949 - Le vent se couche (in French)
 1952 - Vereenvoudigingen
 1954 - De onverzoenlijken
 1954 - Kortschrift
 1958 - Onderzoek en vertoog
 1959 - Tegengif
 1962 - Het werkelijkheidsgehalte in de West-Europese literatuur
 1968 - Verzamelde gedichten
 1972 - Bijbedoelingen

References
Profile at the Digital library for Dutch literature

1892 births
1974 deaths
Dutch male poets
Writers from Haarlem
Constantijn Huygens Prize winners
P. C. Hooft Award winners
20th-century Dutch poets
20th-century Dutch male writers

Jean Rousselot. Dictionnaire de la poesie francaise contemporaine
1968, Auge, Guillon, Hollier -Larousse, Mooreau et Cie.-Librairie Larousse, Paris